Guilherme Castilho Carvalho (born 19 September 1999) is a Brazilian footballer who plays for as a midfielder for Ceará Sporting Club .

Career statistics

Club

Honours
Atlético Mineiro
Supercopa do Brasil: 2022
Campeonato Mineiro: 2022

References

1999 births
Living people
Sportspeople from Tocantins
Brazilian footballers
Association football midfielders
Campeonato Brasileiro Série A players
Campeonato Brasileiro Série B players
Campeonato Brasileiro Série D players
Mirassol Futebol Clube players
Clube Atlético Mineiro players
Associação Desportiva Confiança players
Esporte Clube Juventude players
Ceará Sporting Club players